Mohamed Gouider (3 October 1940 – 18 January 2020) was a Tunisian middle-distance runner. He competed in the men's 1500 metres at the 1960 Summer Olympics.

References

External links
 

1940 births
2020 deaths
Athletes (track and field) at the 1960 Summer Olympics
Tunisian male middle-distance runners
Olympic athletes of Tunisia
Place of birth missing